Fox Park may refer to:

 Fox Park (Molalla, Oregon)
 Fox Park, St. Louis
 Fox Park, Wyoming